Lenka Hiklová, née Lackovičová (born March 8, 1980), of the HK Kamenná Chata is a Slovakian ski mountaineer. Amongst others, she finished eighth in the team event of the 2003 European Championship of Ski Mountaineering, together with Anna Pažitná.

External links 
 Lenka Hiklová at skimountaineering.org

References 

1980 births
Living people
Slovak female ski mountaineers